The Tourist was a train run by the Southern Railway on the railway lines of the Isle of Wight.  It was set up in 1933 as an extension on the original East and West Through Train from the previous year. It was the only named train on the Isle of Wight, and one of the very few express trains.

A change of locomotive was needed at Newport as the Newport-Freshwater line's bridges could not take the weight of locomotive other than the A1 "Terrier" class. When extended as The Tourist the train started from Ventnor but a locomotive change was still required. By 1934, it called at  before Shanklin, but the stops at Merstone and Carisbrooke were removed. As bridges were also strengthened to allow LSWR O2 Class to haul the train throughout, the train was now much faster, completing the full through journey in 1 hour 17 minutes.

The train was withdrawn for the duration of World War II, but resumed immediately on VE Day. However, by September 1953 the line from Newport to Yarmouth and Freshwater was closed, spelling the end for The Tourist.

References

Sources 
 

Named passenger trains of the Southern Railway
Named passenger trains of British Rail
Rail transport on the Isle of Wight
Railway services introduced in 1933